Kremenchuk River Port also called Kremenchug River Port is a port located on the Dnipro in the city of Kremenchuk, Poltava Oblast, Ukraine. The Port of Kremenchuk has seven piers (4 on the Dnipro and 3 on the rivers Donets, Sula, and Vorskla), as well as river stations in Kremenchuk, Svitlovodsk, and Horishni Plavni.

The repair base of the port consists of:

 ship repair shops
 a floating dock for lifting and repairing self-propelled and non-self-propelled vessels
 a stern lift with a capacity of 320 tons

The port has the ability to send and receive cargo by river, road, and rail. The material base of the port includes: fleet, cargo section, dock, and ship repair shops. The port is open to river-sea vessels (up to 120 m long and up to 3.5 m draft). It is also possible to ship cargo in five-ton containers and in international 20-foot containers. Cargo processing is carried out by gantry cranes with a carrying capacity of 5-20 tons by transshipment from one mode of transport to another (including rail, road, and water). The port has specialized open warehouses and closed warehouses for storage of these cargoes.

References

River ports of Ukraine
Kremenchuk
Economy of Ukraine by city
Companies of Ukraine by city